Georgy Mikhailovich Vitsin (18 April 1917 – 22 October 2001) was a Soviet and Russian actor. People's Artist of the USSR (1990).

Biography 
Vitsin was born in Terijoki, former Finland, now Zelenogorsk, Saint Petersburg in 1917 (Soviet documents list him as having been born in Petrograd — now Saint Petersburg). He enjoyed a long acting career and continued performing until close to the end of his life. Apart from playing with Yuri Nikulin and Yevgeny Morgunov, he appeared in dozens of films that earned him the adoration of millions.

Modest and sympathetic characters played by Vitsin evoked kindly feelings of viewers. At the same time the actor played in detective, historical and lyrical feature films.

His first film roles date to the 1940s. He gained nationwide popularity in the former Soviet Union with the emergence of a series of 1960s comedies by director Leonid Gaidai. He played the role of the Coward among a trio of colorful, scheming characters in such Gaidai movies as Bootleggers (1962), Operation Y and Shurik's Other Adventures (1965), and Kidnapping, Caucasian Style (1967). The last two subsequently beat the Soviet all-time record of ticket sales. The trio of actors, including the late Yuri Nikulin and Yevgeny Morgunov, was "the most popular ensemble in the history of the national cinema." In 1990, he was awarded the top artistic title of the Soviet era, that of People's Artist of the USSR.

In spite of the plenty of his characters Vitsin's talent deserved something greater and he never played the major role of his life. “Vitsin is awfully gifted and both of us together are not worth his finger”, his partners Nikulin and Morgunov said about him.

According to an Oscar-nominee film director Nikita Mikhalkov, Vitsin "was one of those rare people and actors whom upon meeting, you immediately feel as if they must know just as much about you as you know about them." According to Mikhalkov, Vitsin was also rare in that his popularity did not affect his personality. He was modest to the point that even in the years leading up to his death, when his financial circumstances were abysmal, he never asked for help. Russian media reported that Vitsin had declined into alcoholism and vagrancy but these reports were false.

During the last seven years of his life Georgy Vitsin did not act in films and appeared only in comic concerts of the Theatre of Film Actor.

He died on 22 October 2001 at 4:30 p.m. He was buried at Vagankovo Cemetery, Moscow.

A monument to Georgy Vitsin was established in Zelenogorsk in 2008 marking the town's 460th jubilee and the 90th anniversary since the actor's birthday.

Selected filmography

Film

1937: Bespridannitsa
1944: Ivan the Terrible — oprichnik
1945: Hello Moscow! — railwayman
1946: The Great Glinka — spectator
1952: Composer Glinka — Nikolai Gogol
1953: Belinsky — Nikolai Gogol
1954: The Boys from Leningrad — Vasia Vesnushkin
1955: Twelfth Night — sir Andrew
1956: Maxim Perepelitsa — grandpa Musiy
1956: The Mexican — Billy Carthey
1956: Murder on Dante Street — Pitu
1957: Poet — (uncredited)
1957: Don Quixote — Sanson Carrasco
1957: She Loves You — Kostya Kanareykin
1957: Wrestler and a clown — Enrico
1958: New attraction — Semion Iljich
1958: A Groom from the Other World — Pyotr Petrovich Fikusov
1958: A Girl with a Guitar
1959:  Ottsy i deti — Sitnikov
1959: I Was a Satellite of the Sun — Uchyonyy
1959: Vasily Surikov — Ilya Repin
1959: Kak possorilis Ivan Ivanovich s Ivanom Nikiforovichem — Gogol
1960:  Tri rasskaza Chekhova — Degtyaryov (segment "A Vengeance")
1961: Dog Barbos and Unusual Cross (Short) — Coward
1961: End of old Beryozovka — Geometry teacher
1961: Bootleggers — Coward (segment "Pyos Barbos i neobychainy kross")
1962: Artist from Kokhanivka — Grandfather Kuzma
1962: The Way to the pier — intellectual in the sobering-up station
1962: Colleagues1963:  Molchat tolko statui — Jacques Meslier
1963: Strictly Business — avantyurist Sam (segment "The Ransom of Red Chief")
1963: Kain XVIII — Freelance Hangman
1963: The first trolleybus — drunk man
1963: Blind Bird — train passenger
1963: Short stories1964: A Tale of Lost Times — evil wizard Andrew
1964: Spring chores — uncle Pudya
1965: Balzaminov's Marriage — Misha Balzaminov
1965: Give Me a Book of Complaints — Zaveduyushchiy otdelom
1965: Zaychik — assistant director
1965: Operation Y and Other Adventures of Shurik — The Coward (segment "Operatsiya Y")
1965: Road to the sea1966: Byvayet i tak1966: Udivitelnaya istoriya, pokhozhaya na skazki1966: Podi tuda, ne znayu kuda — Narrator
1966: Who invented the wheel? — Uncle
1966: The Formula of the Rainbow — Director of the toy factory
1966: Kidnapping, Caucasian Style — Coward
1967: Seven Old Men and One Girl — Coward
1968: Tatyanin den — Man Offering New Chronology
1968: Save the drowning — Militia Precinct Chief
1968: An Old, Old Tale — Dobryy Bolshebnik
1969: The Diamond Arm — Drunk Man
1969: Golfstrim — Igor's Father
1969: In the thirteenth hour of the night — Ovinny
1969: Kabacjok "13 chairs" (TV Series) — pan Cypa
1970: Step off the roof — englishman
1970: Guardian — Tebenkov
1970: As we were looking Tishka — Petty Officer Stepanov
1971:  Kak my iskali Tishku1971: The Twelve Chairs — fitter Mechnikov
1971: The Shadow — doctor
1971: Gentlemen of Fortune — Gavrila Sheremetev (Sad Sack)
1971: Spring tale (TV Movie) — Tsar Berendey
1972: The mortal enemy — Yegor
1972: Tobacco Captain (TV Movie) — cook
1973: Incorrigible Liar — Alexei Ivanovich Tyutyurin
1973: The Sannikov Land — Ignaty
1973: Chipollino — lawer Vetch
1973: Have you ever loved?1974: Tsarevich Prosha — «King Katorz IX»
1974: North Rhapsody — seller
1974: Honey boy — Macintosh
1974: My destiny (Short) — drunk man
1975: Car, Violin and  the Dog Klyaksa — Banjo / Guitar
1975: The big attraction — Gankin
1975: It Can't Be! — Papanya nevesty
1975: Finist, the brave Falcon — Agafon
1975: Puzyrki1975: Shag navstrechu — people at the buffet
1976: The Blue Bird — Sugar
1976: Shag navstrechu — Man
1976: Au-u! — Learning
1976: Shepherd Yanka — Prince Kukimor
1976: Merry dreams or Laughter and Tears (TV Movie) — Krivello
1977: Twelve Chairs (TV Mini-Series) — Bezenchuk
1977: The sun, the sun again1977: Until the clock strikes — Grandfather / The Great Gardener
1977: Marinka, Yanka and the secrets of the royal castle — Prince Kukimor
1978: Istoriya s metranpazhem — Semyon Kaloshin
1980: Borrowing Matchsticks — Tahvo Kenonen, tailor
1980: Comedy of bygone days — Coward
1981: Ruki vverkh!1982: Love by Request — Hapless Boyfriend-artist (voice, uncredited)
1982: Sorcerers (TV Movie) — cat (voice)
1983: The Pokrovsky Gate — Savelich (voice)
1985: Rivals — old man
1985: Dangerous for Your Life! — Alexander Chokolov
1986: Travel Pan Klyaksa1986: I counselor outpost1992: Shot in a coffin — Colonel Zakusnyak
1992: Gospoda Artisty — Nil Palych
1993: Brave guys — Maj. Vasily Griboyedov
1994: A Few Love Stories — Fornari
1994: Lord actors — Nil Palych
1994: Hagi-Tragger — Genrikh Yanovich

Cartoons
1947: The Humpbacked Horse — the chamberlain (voice, uncredited)
1955: The Enchanted Boy — Rozenbaum (voice)
1956: The Twelve Months — Raven / Herald / Parrot / February (voice, uncredited)
1959: Beloved Beauty — Trukha (voice)
1960: The Adventures of Buratino — Giuseppe / Clown / Crow (voice)
1960: It Was I Who Drew the Little Man — the Confectioner / Poet (voice)
1961: The Key — (voice)
1968: Film, Film, Film (Short) — Film director (voice)
1976: Konyok-gorbunok — Spalnik (voice)
1981: Maria, Mirabela — Caterpillar King (Soviet dub voice)
1991: Priklyucheniya volshebnogo globusa, ili prodelki vedmy — The Little Signor (voice)
1992: Oy, rebyata, ta-ra-ra (voice)
1993: Dreamers from the Village of Ugory'' — Koschei the Immortal

References

External links

Georgi Vitsin
Дочь актёра Георгия Вицина Наталья: «Папе больше подходила его первая профессия — художника»

1917 births
2001 deaths
20th-century Russian male actors
Honored Artists of the RSFSR
People's Artists of the RSFSR
People's Artists of the USSR
Russian male film actors
Russian male stage actors
Russian male voice actors
Soviet male film actors
Soviet male stage actors
Soviet male voice actors
Burials at Vagankovo Cemetery